Grey College (Afrikaans: Grey Kollege) is a semi-private English & Afrikaans medium school for boys situated in the suburb of Universitas in Bloemfontein in the Free State province of South Africa, it is one of the 23 Milner Schools. The sister school is Eunice High School (Bloemfontein).

Grey College was ranked 1st among high schools in Africa by Africa Almanac in 2003 and 2013, based upon quality of education, student engagement, strength and activities of alumni, school profile, internet and news visibility.

History 

The school was officially opened on 13 October 1855 and the first headmaster was the Reverend Andrew Murray. Believed by scholars and alumni to be the third-oldest school in South Africa, there are in fact several other schools that were established at earlier dates as far back as 1738. With formal education being established later in the northern regions of the country, it is the oldest school north of the Orange River.

During his presidential inauguration speech in 1896, while addressing learners from Grey College, Marthinus Theunis Steyn mentioned that he envisioned a university for Bloemfontein where youth from all over the country could come and study. He supported the idea that Grey College should provide higher education to the people of the Orange Free State. As a result, the University of the Free State essentially came into existence in 1904 when a tertiary portion of Grey College was allocated for such purpose.

Grey College today
The school grounds consist of a number of historic buildings, of which five are Free State provincial heritage sites: the Main building and Hamilton Hall, the Andrew Murray House, the Brill House and the Tuck shop.

The school offers a number of scholarships such as the Badawi Legacy scholarship given in partnership with Montpellier Rugby Club to promote rugby, education and French culture. Old Greys donate funds to the Jock Meiring Trust and Bram Fisher Trust, funds used for the administration of school grounds and granting of scholarships.

Gallery

Notable alumni

Laurens van der Post Sir Laurens van der Post was political adviser to British heads of government, close friend of Prince Charles, godfather of Prince William, educator, journalist, humanitarian, philosopher, explorer and conservationist.
Ernst Oswald Johannes Westphal, linguist and scholar, of the School of Oriental and African Studies and the University of Cape Town.
Jopie Fourie, military scout & dispatch rider 
 Etienne Leroux, Afrikaans author and a key member of the South African Sestigers literary movement.
Charl du Plessis, pianist.
 Denis Earp, chief of the South African Air Force
 Bram Fischer, anti-apartheid activist and advocate for Nelson Mandela in the Rivonia Trial
 Steve Hofmeyr, singer, songwriter, actor, political activist
 Deneys Reitz, Boer soldier, South African soldier in the First World War, and politician.
 Martinus Theunis Steyn, president of the Orange Free State
 Pieter Uys, Vodacom CEO
 Pierre van Ryneveld, founding commander of the South African Air Force

Sport people
 Ryk Neethling, Olympic gold medalist swimmer
Pierre-Gerard Geldenhuys, South African Men's Field & Indoor Hockey
 L.J. van Zyl, athlete, Commonwealth Games champion in the 400m Hurdles
 Wayde van Niekerk, Olympic Gold Medalist 400m Athlete & World record holder 400m track
 Richardt Strauss, Ireland international rugby player

South Africa national cricket team players
 Kepler Wessels
 Victor Mpitsang
 Nicky Boje
 Hansie Cronjé (his ashes are kept at the school)
 Ryan McLaren

Springbok rugby players
 CJ van der Linde
 Flip van der Merwe
 Francois Venter
 Popeye Strydom
 Deon Stegmann
 François Steyn
 Johan Goosen
 Coenie Oosthuizen
 Ruan Pienaar (also played for Ulster)
 Pieter Muller
 Ruben Kruger (Rugby World Cup 1995 winning team)
 Ollie le Roux
 Tiaan Liebenberg
 Louis Babrow
 Heinrich Brüssow
 Naka Drotské (Rugby World Cup 1995 winning team)
 Bismarck du Plessis (Rugby World Cup 2007 winning team)
 Jannie du Plessis (Rugby World Cup 2007 winning team)
 Morne du Plessis (member of the International Rugby Hall of Fame)
 Wian du Preez
 Charl Marais
 Johan Styger
 Heinrich Füls
 Werner Swanepoel
 Helgard Muller
 Adriaan Strauss
 Andries Truscott
 Cobus Reinach
 Jaco Reinach

 Bafana Bafana football players
 Tshegofatso Mabasa(Orlando Pirates Player)

References

External links

 Grey College Official Site 
 Grey College High School
 Grey College Primary School
 School of Rugby Profile

Boys' schools in South Africa
Boarding schools in South Africa
Schools in the Free State (province)
Education in Bloemfontein
Educational institutions established in 1855
1855 establishments in the Orange Free State
Herbert Baker buildings and structures